Chalo Koi Baat Nahi is a 2021 Indian Hindi language sketch comedy show which has been released on SonyLIV. This show was directed by Sukriti Tyagi and produced by Indranil Chakraborty. It has been created by stand-up comedians, Gursimran Khamba and Amit Tandon with the writing team of Manuj Chawla, Md Anas, Rohan Desai and Gurleen Pannu. The duo of Vinay Pathak and Ranvir Shorey unite as the show's presenters.

The show was officially released on SonyLIV on 20 August 2021.

Cast
 Vinay Pathak (host)
 Ranvir Shorey (host)
 Kavita Kaushik
 Karan Wahi
 Vibha Chibber
 Suresh Menon
 Atul Khatri
 Abish Mathew
 Amit Tandon
 Kriti Vij
 Ankush Bahuguna

Episodes
Chalo Ko Baat Nahin is a 6 episode fictional sketch comedy show and all 6 episodes focus on a specific pillar of modern India like Media, Sports, Education, Hospitals, Environment, and Railways. Combining stand-up comedy and sketches in the show, it gives hilarious insight into why we all handle problems with the age-old saying, 'Chalo Koi Baat Nahi'.

References

External links
 
 Chalo Koi Nahi Baat Official Website

2021 Indian television seasons
Indian comedy web series